Awlad Mandil or Banu Madil were a family of the Maghrawa that ruled several regions in North Africa from c. 1160 to 1372.

His origin was Khazrun ben Falful ancestor of the Banu Khazrun, who ruled Tripoli from 1001 to 1146. From the Banu Khazrum issued several branches, but the main ones were: one that ruled Tripoli and one that ruled Chelif.

This last one was originated from Abu Nas; his son was Ibn Abu Nas; this has a son called Mandil I, Almohad governor of Chelif c. 1160. His son, Abd al-Rhaman ben Mandil was also governor of Chelif c. 1180.

Mandil II ben Abd al-Rahman was governor of Chelif, Uarsenis, Madiyya (Médéa) and Mitidja c. 1190-1126. Was killed in 1126 by Yahya Ibn Ghaniya that occupied Mitidja. Mandil II has several sons:
 Al Abbas ben Mandil, governor of Chelif 1226-1249, that lost Médéa and Uersenis against the Banu Tudjin but received Mliana, Tenes, Brechk and Cherchell from the Hafsids, as vassal.
 Muhammad I ben Mandil, heir of his brother 1249-1263 (killed by Aid)
 Aid ben Mandil, governor of Uersenis and Madiyya 1263-1269
 Umar ben Mandil, emir of Maghrawa 1269-1278 (installed by the Abdalwadid dynasty)
 Thabit ben Mandil, emir of Maghrawa 1278-1294 sold Tlemcen to Abdalwadid waiting obtain Mliana in exchange.

Muhammad ben Thabit was emir from 1294 to 1295 in absence of his father. The Abdalwadid dynasty occupied their lands in 1295. Rashid ben Thabit ben Mandil asked for help to Marinid dynasty of Morocco (1295), but the emirate was assigned to Umar ben Waghram ben Mandil (c. 1299-13002). Rashid revolted in Mazuna and defeated Umar ben Waghram, ruling the Maghrawa 1302-1310, allied to Hafsid dynasty of Bugia (Bidjaya) after 1307. In 1310 Rashid died, and his son Ali ben Rashid was deposed by the Hafsid dynasty, migrating to Morocco with his followers. In 1342, after a defeat of Hafsid against Marinids, he took Mliana, Tenes, Brechk and Cherchel, reestablishing the emirate of Maghrawa, but defeated by the Addalwadid (1351/1352) he committed suicide. His son Hamza ben Ali moved to Morocco. He come back to the Chelif and revolted with the help of the Maghrawa (1371) against Marinids, but was defeated in 1371, and fled to the lands of the tribe of Banu Husayn (that were revolted against Marinids with the help of Abdalwadids) and took the title of emir of Titteri. Defeated in Timzught was captured and executed (1372).

Berber dynasties